Daniel Pellerin, (born 30 December 1941) is a French former rugby league player who played in the 1960s and 1970s, as a .

Background
Daniel Pellerin was born in Rouen, France.

Playing career 
He played for Roanne and for  Villeneuve-sur-Lot. He was also called up to represent France at the   1968 Rugby League World Cup, including the final lost against Australia. He also worked as a clerk.

Honours 

 Rugby League :
 World Cup :
 Finalist in 1968 (France).
 French Championship :
 2 times finalist in 1965 and 1974 (Villeneuve-sur-Lot).
 Lord Derby Cup :
 4 times finalist in 1966, 1969 et 1970 et 1972 (Villeneuve-sur-Lot).

Caps 
17 caps for France

Cap details

References 

 

1941 births
France national rugby league team players
French rugby league players
Living people
Rugby league wingers
Sportspeople from Rouen
Villeneuve Leopards players
RC Roanne XIII players
20th-century French people